Ghawr Gharbiyah (also spelled Ghor Gharbiya or Ghouri) is a town in central Syria, administratively part of the Homs Governorate, northwest of Homs. Nearby localities include Qazhal to the southeast, Akrad Dayasinah to the east, Burj Qa'i to the northeast, Taldou and Kafr Laha to the northwest and Sharqliyya and al-Qabu to the west. According to the Central Bureau of Statistics (CBS), Ghawr Gharbiyah had a population of 4,016 in the 2004 census. Its inhabitants are predominantly Shia Muslims.

In 1829, during Ottoman rule, the village consisted of 30 feddans and paid 3,080 qirsh in annual tax revenues. In 1838 Ghawr Gharbiyah was classified as a Sunni Muslim village.

References

Bibliography

 

Populated places in Homs District
Shia Muslim communities in Syria